Saint Giles, St Giles, or St Giles' may refer to:

People
 Saint Giles, a 7th-8th century Christian hermit saint
 Blessed Aegidius of Assisi (died 1262)

Churches

Canada 
 St. Giles Presbyterian Church (Ottawa), Ontario

Czech Republic 
 St. Giles' Church (Prague)

Germany 
Aegidienkirche, Braunschweig
St Giles' Church, Erfurt
Aegidienkirche, Hanover
Aegidienkirche, Heilbad Heiligenstadt
Aegidienkirche, Lübeck
Aegidienkirche, Speyer

Italy 
 Sant'Egidio (church) in Trastevere, Rome

Poland 
 St. Giles' Church, Inowłódz
 Church of St. Giles, Kraków

Slovakia 
 St. Giles' Church (Bardejov) in Bardejov

Spain 
 San Gil Church in Burgos, Spain

United Kingdom 
England
 Church of St. Giles, Killamarsh, Derbyshire
 St Giles' Church, Balderton, Nottinghamshire
 St Giles' Church, Barrow, Shropshire
 St Giles' Church, Bodiam, Bodiam, East Sussex
 St Giles' Church, Camberwell, London
 St Giles' Church, Cambridge
 St Giles Church, Carburton, Nottinghamshire
 St. Giles' Catholic Church, Cheadle, Staffordshire
 St Giles' Church, Copmanthorpe, York
 St. Giles' Church, Costock, Nottinghamshire
 St. Giles' Church, Cromwell, Nottinghamshire
 St. Giles' Church, Cropwell Bishop, Nottinghamshire
 St Giles' Church, Darlton, Nottinghamshire
 St Giles Church, Durham, County Durham
 St Giles' Church, Edingley, Nottinghamshire
 St Giles' Church, Exhall, Warwickshire
 St Giles' Church, Elkesley, Nottinghamshire
 St Giles' Church, Grimsby, Lincolnshire
 St Giles' Church, Holme, Nottinghamshire
 St Giles' Church, Horsted Keynes, West Sussex
 St Giles' Church, Ickenham, Hillingdon, London
 St Giles' Church, Imber, Wiltshire
 Church of St Giles, Leigh-on-Mendip, Somerset
St Giles Church, Lincoln, Lincolnshire
 St Giles' Church, Longstone, Derbyshire
 St Giles' Church, Matlock, Derbyshire
 St Giles' Church, Normanton, Derby
 St Giles' Church, Norwich, Norfolk
 St Giles' Church, Ollerton, Nottinghamshire
 St Giles' Church, Oxford
 St Giles' Church, Reading, Berkshire
 St Giles' Church, Sandiacre, Derbyshire
 St Giles' Church, Sheldon, Birmingham
 St Giles' Church, Skelton, York
 St Giles' Church, South Mimms, Hertfordshire
 St Giles' Church, Standlake, Oxfordshire
 St Giles's Church, Tattenhoe, Milton Keynes
 Church of St Giles, Totternhoe, Bedfordshire
 St. Giles Church, West Bridgford, Nottinghamshire
 St Giles Church, Willenhall, Walsall, West Midlands
 St Giles Church, Wormshill, Kent
 St Giles-without-Cripplegate, London
 St Giles in the Fields, London

Scotland
 St Giles' Cathedral, Edinburgh
 St Giles' Church, Elgin, Moray

Wales
 St Giles' Church, Wrexham

United States 
 Saint Giles Episcopal Church in Moraga, California, United States

Places

Trinidad and Tobago 
 Saint Giles Island

United Kingdom 
 St Giles, London, a district
 St Giles Circus, a street in London
 St Giles', Oxford, England 
 Chalfont St Giles, Buckinghamshire, England
 Houghton Saint Giles, Norfolk
 St Giles Estate, Lincoln

Other uses 
 St. Giles (horse), a Thoroughbred racehorse, winner of the 1832 Epsom Derby
 St. Giles (Hebron, Maryland), an historic house in the United States
 St Giles Fair, held annually in Oxford, England
 St Giles International, an English language school group
 The Leper of Saint Giles, a 1981 novel by Ellis Peters
 Community of Sant'Egidio, a Catholic lay society
 HMAS St Giles, a tugboat of the Royal Navy and Royal Australian Navy

See also 
 Saint-Gilles (disambiguation)
 Sant'Egidio (disambiguation)
 St. Egidien (disambiguation)

cs:Kostel svatého Jiljí
de:Ägidienkirche
es:Iglesia de San Gil
it:Chiesa di Sant'Egidio
nl:Sint-Gilliskerk